Bhawani Prasad Khapung (born 5 October 1961) is a Nepali politician. He was elected as a Member of Parliament (MP) in the House of Representatives from Terathum 1 (constituency) in the 2017 General Election. He is a member of the CPN (Unified Socialist).

See also 

 CPN (Unified Socialist)

References

Living people
Nepal MPs 2017–2022
Communist Party of Nepal (Unified Socialist) politicians
Members of the 2nd Nepalese Constituent Assembly
Communist Party of Nepal (Unified Marxist–Leninist) politicians
1961 births